Şükrü Birand (1 January 1944 – 28 June 2019) was a Turkish footballer who played as a right-back for Fenerbahçe.

Career
Born in Ankara, Birand started his professional career with Toprakspor in 1960–61 and then transferred to PTT Ankara (1961–1964). Then he transferred to Fenerbahçe where he played ten years between 1964–1974 and scored 7 goals in 317 matches with them.

He graduated from Istanbul Economics and Administrative Sciences Academy.

References

External links
 

1944 births
2019 deaths
Turkish footballers
Association football fullbacks
Turkey international footballers
Fenerbahçe S.K. footballers
Marmara University alumni